Zsiga is both a Hungarian given name and a surname. Notable people with the name include:

Zsiga Pankotia (1930–1961), Hungarian murderer
Abigail Zsiga, English singer
Ervin Zsiga (born 1991), Romanian footballer
Marcell Zsiga (born 1979), Hungarian jurist

Hungarian-language surnames